Bəydili or Beydili may refer to:
Bəydili, Bilasuvar, Azerbaijan
Bəydili, Salyan, Azerbaijan
Bəydili, Yevlakh, Azerbaijan

See also
Beydili, Bayat
Beydilli, Çivril
Beydili, Çorum
Beydili, Gülnar, Turkey